The Army Institute of Management, formerly the National Institute of Management Calcutta (NIMC), is a graduate business school located in Kolkata, India. It was established on 28 July 1997 by the Indian Army under the aegis of Army Welfare Education Society (AWES), New Delhi, to conduct a management programme (MBA) for the wards of Army personnel with an opportunity for  general candidates as well. The institute will be inviting the new batch for their BBA programme in July 2022.

About college
The college is affiliated with Maulana Abul Kalam Azad University of Technology and the programme is approved by the All India Council for Technical Education. Also it has been accredited by NAAC. It is also an ISO 9001:2015 certified college.

The old campus was located at Judges Court Road, Alipore.
Currently, they are operating from their new campus in New Town, opposite to Downtown Mall and right beside the R&D Campus of IIT Kharagpur.

Academics
The institute offers a single post-graduate course:

 Master of Business Administration - two years [Approved intake - 120]

Notable alumni
 Navdeep Singh

See also

References

External links

 
University Grants Commission
National Assessment and Accreditation Council

Business schools in Kolkata
Educational institutions established in 1997
Colleges affiliated to West Bengal University of Technology
Engineering colleges in Kolkata
1997 establishments in West Bengal